Eriodes is a monotypic genus of orchids (family Orchidaceae) from Asia. Its sole known species is Eriodes barbata.

It is native to Southeast Asia, in Yunnan, Bhutan, Assam, Myanmar, Thailand and Vietnam.

References

Collabieae
Collabieae genera
Monotypic Epidendroideae genera
Orchids of Myanmar
Orchids of China
Orchids of India
Orchids of Thailand
Orchids of Vietnam